The 1914 Kendall Orange and Black football team represented Henry Kendall College (later renamed the University of Tulsa) during the 1914 college football season. Local businessmen urged Sam P. McBirney, who had coached the team in 1908, to take over as the football coach. Prior to 1913, the bulk of its games had been played against high school teams. From 1914 to 1916, McBirney built the Kendall football team into one of the best in the country.

Schedule

References

Kendall
Tulsa Golden Hurricane football seasons
Kendall Orange and Black football